The Amazonia Conference is a global warming activist organization with a particular focus on education of the public.

The Conference was established in April 1990, when governments of the world were discussing the dangers of global warming at the Earth Summit in Rio de Janeiro in 1992. The Conference is an educational organisation with the aim of educating people about the endangered natural environment and what the group believes to be inevitable catastrophic consequences if no proactive and preventive steps are taken.

References

External links
 
 
 

International organizations based in the Americas
International climate change organizations
Environmental organizations established in 1990
1990 establishments in Brazil